Christmas Bounty is a 2013 American television film directed by Gil Junger. It was produced by WWE Studios and stars Francia Raisa, Mike "The Miz" Mizanin and Will Greenberg. It premiered on ABC Family during their 25 Days of Christmas block on November 26, 2013.

Plot
Tory, a teacher at an exclusive Manhattan private school is a former bounty hunter who is forced out of retirement for one final capture. With her current fiancée in the fold, she gets help from her former bad boy boyfriend to get one last capture of a former capture seeking revenge, while trying to keep her fiancée from finding out her dangerous past.

Cast
 Francia Raisa as Tory Bell
 Mike "The Miz" Mizanin as Mike
 Will Greenberg as James
 Chelan Simmons as Liz
 April Telek as Gale Bell
 Michael Hanus as Hawk Bell
 Malcolm Stewart as Gray Ballantine
 Karen Kruper as Dina Ballantine
 Sean Quan as Bobby

Production
Christmas Bounty began production in April 2013.

References

External links

2010s English-language films
American comedy television films
Action television films
WWE Studios films
Films directed by Gil Junger
2010s American films